Denis Sullivan was an Australian shipbuilder and key figure in the development of the town of Coopernook.  He built ships at Coopernook, Cape Hawke, Berrys Bay and Clarence Town. He died in 1916 in Balmain, New South Wales.

Ships built

References

1916 deaths
Australian shipbuilders
Year of birth missing